The meridian 72° east of Greenwich is a line of longitude that extends from the North Pole across the Arctic Ocean, Asia, the Indian Ocean, the Southern Ocean, and Antarctica to the South Pole.

The 72nd meridian east forms a great circle with the 108th meridian west.

From Pole to Pole
Starting at the North Pole and heading south to the South Pole, the 72nd meridian east passes through:

{| class="wikitable plainrowheaders"
! scope="col" width="120" | Co-ordinates
! scope="col" | Country, territory or sea
! scope="col" | Notes
|-
| style="background:#b0e0e6;" | 
! scope="row" style="background:#b0e0e6;" | Arctic Ocean
| style="background:#b0e0e6;" |
|-
| style="background:#b0e0e6;" | 
! scope="row" style="background:#b0e0e6;" | Kara Sea
| style="background:#b0e0e6;" |
|-
| 
! scope="row" | 
| Yamal Peninsula, Yamalo-Nenets Autonomous Okrug
|-
| style="background:#b0e0e6;" | 
! scope="row" style="background:#b0e0e6;" | Gulf of Ob
| style="background:#b0e0e6;" |
|-
| 
! scope="row" | 
| Yamal Peninsula, Yamalo-Nenets Autonomous Okrug
|-
| style="background:#b0e0e6;" | 
! scope="row" style="background:#b0e0e6;" | Gulf of Ob
| style="background:#b0e0e6;" |
|-
| 
! scope="row" | 
|Yamalo-Nenetsia, Khantia-Mansia, Tyumen Oblast, Omsk Oblast
|-
| 
! scope="row" | 
|North Kazakhstan, Akmola, Karaganda, Zhambyl
|-
| 
! scope="row" | 
|Talas, Jalal-Abad
|-
| 
! scope="row" | 
|Namangan, Andijan, Fergana
|-
| 
! scope="row" | 
|Batken, Osh
|-
| 
! scope="row" | 
|DCGJ, Kuhistan-Badakhshon
|-
| 
! scope="row" | 
|Badakhshan Province
|-valign="top"
| 
! scope="row" | 
| Khyber Pakhtunkhwa Punjab
|-valign="top"
| 
! scope="row" | 
| Rajasthan Gujarat
|-valign="top"
| style="background:#b0e0e6;" | 
! scope="row" style="background:#b0e0e6;" | Indian Ocean
| style="background:#b0e0e6;" | Passing just east of Cherbaniani Reef, Lakshadweep,  Passing just east of Byramgore Reef, Lakshadweep,  Passing just west of Bitra atoll, Lakshadweep,  Passing just west of Perumal Par atoll, Lakshadweep,  Passing just west of Agatti Island, Lakshadweep,  Passing just east of Peros Banhos, 
|-
| style="background:#b0e0e6;" | 
! scope="row" style="background:#b0e0e6;" | Southern Ocean
| style="background:#b0e0e6;" |
|-valign="top"
| 
! scope="row" | Antarctica
| Australian Antarctic Territory, claimed by 
|-
|}

See also
71st meridian east
73rd meridian east

e072 meridian east